It's All Me, Vol. 1 (stylized IT'S ALL ME VOL 1) is an extended play by Japanese-American singer-songwriter Ai. It was released on July 8, 2020, through EMI Records and features a departure from the traditional Japanese  and western electropop sounds found in her 2017 studio album, Wa to Yo.

Featuring collaborations with Jenn Morel, Joelii and MJ116, majority of the extended play was recorded in Los Angeles, California.

Background 

To celebrate her twenty-year anniversary in the music industry and the then upcoming 2020 Summer Olympics, Ai began production for an album in 2019. Additionally, a compilation album, Kansha!!!!! - Thank You for 20 Years New and Best, was released by EMI on November 6, 2019 which included tracks previously not available in countries outside of Asia and new material.

The EP's first single, "Summer Magic", was released in May 2019. Both its Japanese and English counterpart were produced and written by The Rascals. "Summer Magic" was also included in an advertisement for the Amazon Echo in Japan. "You Never Know" was released in August 2019, featuring Taiwanese group MJ116 (also known as 頑童MJ116). The third single, "I'm Coming Home", was released in January 2020 and the fourth single, "Good as Gold" in March 2020. The fifth single, "Gift" was released in April 2020.

In May 2020, Ai announced on her social media the title and release date of the EP. Pre-add for Apple Music and Spotify began on June 26, 2020.

Track listing

Personnel 
Credits adapted from Tidal and album's liner notes.

Musicians 

 Ai Carina Uemura – lead vocals, songwriting, production
 Uta – production, songwriting
 Rogét Chahayed – production, songwriting
 Taylor Dexter – production, songwriting
 Lindy Robbins – songwriting
 Jenn Morel – featured artist, songwriting
 Gedrin Joely Morel – featured artist, songwriting
 Mario Parra – songwriting
 Dijonn Gary Grizzell – songwriting
 Silver Age – production
 Leon Thomas III – songwriting
 Khris Riddick-Tynes – songwriting
 The Rascals – production
 MJ116 – featured artist
 Vava – producer, composer
 Mu Yuan Lin  – songwriting, vocals
 Wen Jie Zhou  – songwriting, vocals
 Yu Rong Chen  – songwriting, vocals
 Jin – production
 Ruri Matsumura – songwriting
 Futoshi Kawashima – arrangement

Technical 

 Keisuke Fujimaki – vocal engineering
 Keisuke Suwa – vocal engineering
 Shiori Maruoka – vocal engineering
 Zachary Lin – vocal engineering
 Mario Parra – vocal engineering
 D.O.I – mixing
 Boris Milan - mixing
 Randy Merrill  – mastering
 Ai Carina Uemura – vocal engineering
 MJ116 – vocal engineering

Visuals and imagery 

 Ran Tondabayahsi – art director
 Yousuke Tsuchida – designer
 Hiroki Watanabe – photographer
 Moemi Odo – retouching
 Ai Carina Uemura  – hair, makeup artist
 Akemi Ono – hair, makeup artist
 Noriko Gota – stylist
 Akio Kawabata – design coordination
 Shuma Saito – design coordination

Charts

Release history

Notes

References 

2020 debut EPs
Japanese-language EPs
Spanish-language EPs
Ai (singer) EPs
EMI Records EPs
Universal Music Group EPs
Albums produced by Ai (singer)
Albums impacted by the COVID-19 pandemic